Arbanasi may refer to:

 Arbanasi people, an Albanian population group in Croatia
 Arbanasi dialect, spoken by the Arbanasi people
 Arbanasi, older name for Albanians in South Slavic languages
 Arbanasi (Zadar) (hr), a suburb of Zadar, Croatia
 Arbanasi (Rudo) (bs), a village in Rudo Municipality, Republika Srpska, Bosnia and Herzegovina
 Arbanasi (Veliko Tarnovo), a village in Veliko Tarnovo Municipality, Veliko Tarnovo Province, Bulgaria
 Arbănaşi, a village in Beceni Commune, Buzău County, Romania

See also 
 Arbanas (disambiguation)
 Arbëreshë (disambiguation)

Language and nationality disambiguation pages